Gordon Brooks may refer to:
 Gordon Brooks (cricketer) (1938–2004), Australian cricketer
 Gordon Brooks (photographer) (1939–2021), Barbadian photographer, photojournalist, cricket journalist and newspaper director
 Gord Brooks (1950–2020), Canadian ice hockey right winger